Osceola Town Hall is a historic town hall located at Osceola in Lewis County, New York. It was built in 1882 as Osceola Methodist Church.  It is a one-story, three bay wide, four bay deep Carpenter Gothic building surmounted by a steeply pitched metal clad gable roof with decorative wood trim.  In the 1920s, it was converted for use as a town hall and later a library as well.

It was listed on the National Register of Historic Places in 2005.

References

City and town halls on the National Register of Historic Places in New York (state)
Gothic Revival architecture in New York (state)
Government buildings completed in 1882
Buildings and structures in Lewis County, New York
National Register of Historic Places in Lewis County, New York